Spencer-Churchill is a British double-barrelled surname of a British noble family associated with the Marlborough dukedom.

Notable members  
Lord Alan Spencer-Churchill (1825–1873), British army officer
Albertha Spencer-Churchill, Duchess of Marlborough (1847–1932), English aristocrat
Lord Alfred Spencer-Churchill (1824–1893), British politician
Anne Innes-Ker, Duchess of Roxburghe (née Spencer-Churchill; 1854–1923)
Charles Spencer-Churchill (disambiguation), multiple people
Clarissa Spencer-Churchill (1920–2021), wife of Anthony Eden
Clementine Churchill (1885–1977), life peer and wife of Winston Churchill
Edla Spencer-Churchill, Duchess of Marlborough
Frances Anne Spencer-Churchill, Duchess of Marlborough (1822–1899), English noblewoman
George Spencer-Churchill (disambiguation), multiple people
Gladys Spencer-Churchill, Duchess of Marlborough (1881–1977), French-American socialite
Lady Henrietta Spencer-Churchill (born 1958), English interior decorator
Lord Ivor Spencer-Churchill (1898–1956), British peer
Jane Spencer-Churchill, Duchess of Marlborough (1798–1844)
James Spencer-Churchill, 12th Duke of Marlborough
John Spencer-Churchill (disambiguation), multiple people
Laura Spencer-Churchill, Duchess of Marlborough (1915–1990), British noblewoman and socialite
Lily Spencer-Churchill, Duchess of Marlborough (1854–1909), American socialite
Lady Norah Beatrice Henriette Spencer-Churchill (1875–1946), English aristocrat
Randolph Spencer Churchill (disambiguation), multiple people
Lady Rosemary Spencer-Churchill (born 1929), maid of honour to Elizabeth II at her coronation
Rosita Spencer-Churchill, Duchess of Marlborough (born 1943), British artist
Susan Spencer-Churchill, Duchess of Marlborough (1767–1841)

Others
Lady Spencer-Churchill College, now part of Oxford Brookes University

See also
List of people with surname Spencer
Churchill (surname)

Compound surnames
English-language surnames
Surnames of English origin